Ashes of Love may refer to:
 Ashes of Love (film), a 1918 American silent drama film
 Ashes of Love (TV series), a 2018 Chinese television series